Andrew Toole (born September 11, 1980) is an American basketball head coach from Staten Island, New York. He has served as the head coach at Robert Morris University since May 11, 2010 and is currently the 6th youngest head coach in Division I basketball. Toole had served as an assistant coach at Lafayette College and Robert Morris prior to accepting his first head coaching position. As a player, Toole played at Elon University before transferring to the University of Pennsylvania.

Playing career
Raised in Red Bank, New Jersey, Toole played high school basketball at Christian Brothers Academy, graduating in 1998.

While at Penn, Toole helped guide the Quakers to consecutive NCAA tournament appearances in 2002 and 2003. He served as co-captain for the 2002-03 Quaker team that finished the regular season 22–6. Over his four-year career at Elon and Penn, he averaged 12.3 points per game, while also contributing 3.0 assists and rebounds per game.

Coaching career
Following his graduation from the University of Pennsylvania, Toole spent two years with the Hoop Group, a major AAU high school exposure camp, in Neptune City, New Jersey. Then he took up his first assistant coaching job at Lafayette College in 2006.

Robert Morris
After only one season at Lafayette, Toole moved west and accepted an assistant coaching job with Robert Morris University under former Rutgers University head coach Mike Rice Jr. Toole helped guide the Colonials to two straight NCAA Tournament berths in 2009 and 2010, where they were the 15th seed each time. When Rice left for Rutgers following the 2009–10 season, Robert Morris Director of Athletics Craig Coleman named Toole the 8th head coach in the basketball program's 34 years of existence on May 11, 2010.

"I'm unbelievably excited to be the head coach at Robert Morris University," Toole said during his press conference at the Charles L. Sewall Center. "I take that honor very seriously, and I'm going to work incredibly hard and tirelessly to prove those people right while continuing to build on the success that we've had over the last three years." With his appointment, Toole became the youngest head coach in men's Division I basketball, and the fifth head coach with ties to the Hoop Group, following Rice (Rutgers), Greg Vetrone (Fairleigh Dickinson), Chuck Martin (Marist), and Jesse Agel (Brown).

Toole earned his first head coaching victory on November 13, 2010 against St. Peter's College, a 55–30 triumph at the Sewall Center. The win also set a new school record for points allowed in a game, besting the previous mark of 34 points allowed.

Head coaching record

Personal
Toole is a member of the Friars Senior Society at the University of Pennsylvania and earned his B.A. in Political Science in 2003. He currently resides in Mt. Lebanon, Pennsylvania with his wife and two sons.

References

Andrew Toole @ RMU Colonials

1980 births
Living people
American men's basketball coaches
American men's basketball players
Basketball coaches from New Jersey
Basketball players from New Jersey
Christian Brothers Academy (New Jersey) alumni
College men's basketball head coaches in the United States
Elon Phoenix men's basketball players
Lafayette Leopards men's basketball coaches
Penn Quakers men's basketball players
People from Red Bank, New Jersey
Robert Morris Colonials men's basketball coaches
Sportspeople from Monmouth County, New Jersey
Guards (basketball)